Alliance Defending Freedom (ADF) has been involved in several landmark United States Supreme Court cases, including Rosenberger v. University of Virginia, Good News Club v. Milford Central School  and Town of Greece v. Galloway. Rosenberger was ADF's first landmark case, described by law professor Marci Hamilton as a "fork in the road" with respect to judicial review of the Establishment Clause of the First Amendment. Good News Club and Town of Greece established important precedents relating to Free Speech and the Establishment Clauses of the First Amendment respectively. But its most notable legal victory involved a 2014 case challenging the Affordable Care Act, or Obamacare. In Burwell v. Hobby Lobby Stores, Inc., the Court ruled that the birth control mandate in employee-funded health plans was unconstitutional, since there existed a less restrictive means of furthering the law’s interest. The case set a precedent for evaluating legal questions relating to religious liberty. Since 2015, ADF has played a role in five victories at the Supreme Court.

ADF was founded in 1993 with the stated goal of advocating, training, and funding legal cases on the issues of "religious freedom, sanctity of life, and marriage and family." In 2012 the organization shifted its mission of funding allied attorneys to direct representation of clients though litigation. ADF has been described as "the largest legal force of the religious right arguing hundreds of pro bono cases across the country.

List of cases
Following are legal cases in which the ADF has played a significant role, either by representing a party, filing an amicus brief, or otherwise participating in a substantial manner:

1995
 Rosenberger v. University of Virginia (1995). ADF provided funding to defend a student newspaper which was denied university funding due to its religious nature. The case was litigated all the way to the Supreme Court.

2001
 Good News Club v. Milford Central School (2001). The ADF assisted in this case in which the Supreme Court ruled that religious clubs must be afforded equal access to school facilities.

2004
 City of Littleton (CO) v. Z.J. Gifts (2004). The  Supreme Court ruled unanimously against an adult bookstore in a case involving business licensing. 
 Elk Grove Unified School District v. Newdow (2004). The Supreme Court, in a unanimous opinion, held that the words “under God” in the Pledge of Allegiance did not violate the First Amendment.      
 Williams v. Vidmar (2004). In November 2004, the ADF filed a lawsuit on behalf of a Cupertino, California elementary school teacher against his school principal and school board members. The lawsuit was settled without money changing hands and without changes in school policies.
 Perry v. Schwarzenegger. ADF represented Proposition 8 proponents ProtectMarriage.com in the Federal lawsuit challenging the constitutionality of the proposition, which limited marriage in California to one man and one woman. Their participation generated some criticism. The religious rights law firm Liberty Counsel, which has litigated opposition to same-sex marriage in California since 2004, criticized Alliance Defense Fund's handling of the case.

2006
 Scheidler v. National Organization for Women (2006). Anti-abortion groups were charged with racketeering. In a unanimous decision the Supreme Court ruled in favor of the anti-abortion groups.      
 Ayotte v Planned Parenthood of Northern New England (2006). In a unanimous decision the Supreme Court held that states have a right to require parental notification for abortion. 
 The ADF defended Elane Photography in its appeal of being found in violation of the New Mexico Human Rights Act for refusing to photograph a 2006 civil commitment ceremony. In August 2013 the New Mexico Supreme Court found in favor of Willock and that the photographer was in violation of the act.

2011
 Arizona Christian School Tuition Organization v. Winn (2011). The ADF prevailed against the ACLU in a case regarding a taxpayer funded school choice program.

2012
 Bronx Household of Faith v. Board of Education of the City of New York (2012). The ADF lost this case challenging New York City's prohibition on holding worship services in the City's public schools, and the Supreme Court declined to hear the case.

2014
 Gonzales v. Carhart (2014). The case, which ADF argued before the Supreme Court, upheld the Partial-Birth Abortion Ban of 2003.
 Town of Greece v. Galloway (2014). In a significant victory, the Supreme Court ruled that opening legislative sessions with prayer was constitutional.
 McCullen v. Coakley (2014). ADF obtained a unanimous Supreme Court victory in this case which struck down “buffer zones” which were designed to restrict anti-abortion activists. The ruling was a setback for the abortion rights groups.
 Burwell v. Hobby Lobby Stores, Inc. (2014). In this landmark Supreme Court case, where ADF represented Conestoga, the justices struck down the contraceptive mandate of Obamacare as applied to those with religious objections. 
 The ADF served as co-counsel defending Sally Howe Smith, Court Clerk for Tulsa County (Oklahoma), whose denial of a marriage license to a same-sex couple was challenged in Bishop v. Oklahoma. Smith lost in U.S. District Court in January 2014.
 The ADF represented Dr. Mike Adams in a lawsuit against University of North Carolina Wilmington. A first amendment victory in the United States Court of Appeals for the Fourth Circuit opened the door to a civil trial in which Adams was also victorious. The case concerned denial of promotion to full professor due to constitutionally-protected speech.
 In Bostic v. Rainey, the ADF represented Ms. Michele McQuigg, defendant-intervenor in her official capacity as Prince William County Clerk of Circuit Court; the defendants lost in US District Court in February 2014.
 The ADF defended Virginia's laws against a challenge to the prohibition on same sex marriage, but lost an appeal in the 4th Circuit Court of Appeals on Monday, July 28, 2014; they have stated that they plan to appeal the ruling.

2015
 Reed v. Town of Gilbert (2015). In a First Amendment case, a pastor's right to place signs announcing church services was upheld by the Supreme Court.
 Holt v. Hobbs. The Supreme Court, in a unanimous decision, held that an Arkansas prison policy which prevented an incarcerated Muslim man from growing a short beard in accordance with his deeply-held religious beliefs was unconstitutional.

2016
 Zubik v. Burwell. Two ADF cases, Geneva College v. Burwell and Southern Nazarene University v. Burwell  were consolidated into Zubic and heard before the Supreme Court in 2016. The case addressed non-church coverage of mandated contraceptives under Obamacare. The individual cases were returned to the respective courts of appeal.

 Arlene's Flowers lawsuit. The Washington State Supreme Court rejected a florist's First Amendment claim and ruled in favor of a gay couple who were denied service. The case has been submitted to the United States Supreme Court for consolidation with Masterpiece Cakeshop.

2017
 Trinity Lutheran Church of Columbia, Inc. v. Comer (2017). In an important First Amendment case the Supreme Court ruled that a Missouri playground resurfacing program violated freedom of religion guaranteed by the Free Exercise Clause. ADF represented the petitioner.
ADF joined a lawsuit originally filed in late 2016 by three inmates of the Carswell Federal Medical Center in Fort Worth, Texas. These three inmates—all cisgender women—had complained that being housed with transgender women was "cruel and unusual punishment." (ADF dropped the lawsuit in 2019 because these clients were no longer incarcerated, and because they wished to wait for the outcome of other Supreme Court cases about transgender rights.)

2018
Masterpiece Cakeshop v. Colorado Civil Rights Commission. The lawsuit had the potential of setting a "landmark" First Amendment precedent, according to Fox News.
 National Institute of Family and Life Advocates v. Becerra. Oral arguments in this anti-abortion case were heard at the Supreme Court in 2018. The case pertained to California's FACT Act which mandated crisis pregnancy centers to provide certain disclosures. The high court found those notices to be a free speech violation of the First Amendment.
 Cochran vs. City of Atlanta.  After Kelvin J. Cochran was fired by Atlanta Mayor Kasim Reed, a judge declared unconstitutional the city's preclearance rules on what employees could do on their own time outside work.  Atlanta ended up agreeing to pay $1.2 million to Cochran.

2019 
 Brush & Nib v. City of Phoenix. Two Christian artists who owned a stationery store did not want to make custom wedding invitations for same-sex couples on religious grounds, and wished therefore to have an exemption from a Phoenix, Arizona anti-discrimination ordinance.  The artists were represented by ADF.  Lower court rulings upheld the city ordinance, but the Arizona Supreme Court ruled in September 2019 that, based on the Arizona Constitution, the ordinance violated the free-speech rights of the artists.  The ruling  was on narrow factual grounds and pertained only to custom wedding invitations and the artists' right to free speech, and was neither granted them a blanket exemption from the ordinance, nor was it a ruling on whether the law was constitutional.  Other businesses which wished to be exempt from the law would need to seek their own court order.  The 4-3 decision did not address whether Phoenix's adoption of LGBTQ people as a protected class was legal.

2020 
 R.G. & G.R. Harris Funeral Homes Inc. v. Equal Employment Opportunity Commission. A landmark Supreme Court case ruling that Title VII protection applies to gay and transgender people.

2021
Meriwether v. Hartop, on whether professor was entitled, based on his Christian beliefs, to use the pronouns he believed to be correct for a transgender student, in spite of a contrary university policy.

See also
 List of United States Supreme Court cases involving the First Amendment

References

External links
 Alliance Defending Freedom, official website

ADF
ADF
ADF